The Uruguay women's national under-17 football team represents Uruguay in international competitions.

The women's U-17 team have competed in all four South American Under-17 Women's Championships. As a result of their second place achievement in 2012 they competed at the 2012 FIFA U-17 Women's World Cup in Azerbaijan.

Competitive record

FIFA U-17 Women's World Cup

South American Championship record

Current squad

References

U-17
Women's national under-17 association football teams
U-17
Youth sport in Uruguay